Luay Salah Hassan (born February 7, 1982, in Baghdad, Iraq) is an Iraqi former football player. He played for Al-Quwa Al-Jawiya, Al-Zawraa, Persepolis and Erbil. He scored 121 Iraqi Premier League goals in his career.

Info
After helping Al Quwa Al Jawiya to the Iraq league title in 2005, Louay Salah Hassan moved to Iran Pro League side Persepolis the following season.  The 25-year-old striker gained AFC Champions League experience with Al Quwa Al Jawiya in 2004, scoring a goal against Al Sadd. He was part of the Iraq national team which won the gold medal in the West Asian Games in 2005.

Salah excelled at club level, scoring ten times to steer Arbil FC to the Iraqi league championship in the 2007/08 season, an achievement that earned the club a place at this year's AFC Cup.

At the continental level he netted two goals in the ensuing AFC Cup to steer Arbil FC through to the last 16. In the all-Iraqi affair against compatriots Al Zawra'a, he was again on target as his club emerged 3-1 winners to book a place in the quarter-finals.

The 27-year-old's scoring did not go unnoticed by the newly appointed Iraq coach Bora Miluntinovic, who rewarded him with a place in Iraq's FIFA Confederation Cup squad.

International goals
Scores and results list Iraq's goal tally first.

Coaching career

Al-Quwa Al-Jawiya
Luay Salah started as an assistant coach to Ayoub Odisho in Al-Quwa Al-Jawiya in march of 2019.

Managerial statistics

Honours

Club
Al-Quwa Al-Jawiya
 Iraqi Premier League: 2004–05
Erbil
 Iraqi Premier League: 2007–08, 2008–09, 2011–12
Al-Zawraa
 Iraqi Premier League: 2015–16, 2017–18
Iraq FA Cup: 2016–17
Iraqi Super Cup: 2017

Country 
 2005 West Asian Games Gold medallist.
 2007 Asian Cup winner
 2012 Arab Nations Cup Bronze medallist

As a Manager
Al-Kahrabaa
Iraq FA Cup runners-up: 2021–22

References

External links

Persepolis F.C. players
1982 births
Iraqi footballers
Iraq international footballers
Association football forwards
Expatriate footballers in Iran
Sportspeople from Baghdad
Iraqi expatriate footballers
Living people
Al-Quwa Al-Jawiya players
Erbil SC players
2007 AFC Asian Cup players
2009 FIFA Confederations Cup players
AFC Asian Cup-winning players
Iraqi Premier League managers